The ACM SIGMOD Edgar F. Codd Innovations Award is a lifetime research achievement award given by the ACM Special Interest Group on Management of Data, at its yearly flagship conference (also called SIGMOD). According to its homepage, it is given "for innovative and highly significant contributions of enduring value to the development, understanding, or use of database systems and databases". The award has been given since 1992.

Recipients

See also

 List of computer science awards

References 

Association for Computing Machinery
Awards established in 1992
Computer science awards
Data management